Kickapoo Creek is a tributary of the Illinois River in the U.S. state of Illinois.  After rising in northern Peoria County, it winds through and drains much of the county.  In its lower reaches, the creek drains much of the city of Peoria as it approaches its mouth.  The creek is credited with powering the first factory in Peoria, an 1830 watermill.  Close to the southern city limts of Peoria, the creek discharges into the Illinois River.

The Rock Island Trail passes over upper Kickapoo Creek by bridge.  In its midcourse, the creek flows past Jubilee College State Park and Wildlife Prairie Park.

Kickapoo Creek, according to the USGS station https://waterdata.usgs.gov/il/nwis/uv/?site_no=05580000&PARAmeter_cd=00065,00060 at Waynesville, IL, has an annual discharge of 183 cubic feet per second.

References

Rivers of Peoria County, Illinois
Rivers of Illinois
Tributaries of the Illinois River